Juli Garreta i Arboix (12 March 1875, in Sant Feliu de Guíxols – 2 December 1925) was a Spanish composer, noted for his sardanes.

Works, editions and recordings
Records i somnis.  on Jacint Verdaguer i el lied català. M. Teresa Garrigosa, soprano ; Emili Blasco, piano La mà de Guido, 2005.

References

Composers from Catalonia
1875 births
1925 deaths
Sardana